Qabil Ajmeri (27 August 1931 – 3 October 1962) was a Pakistani Urdu poet.

Biography
Qabil Ajmeri was born on 27 August 1931, as Abdul Rahim in Churli, a town located 24 miles from Ajmer, Rajasthan. He received his early education from Madarsa Nizamiyah Usmaniyah in Dargah Ajmer, before migrating to Pakistan he reside in his ancestral house near Tripolia Gate. He was a disciple of Maani Ajmeri and Armaan Ajmeri. After Partition Qabil migrated to Hyderabad, Sindh. He was diagnosed with Tuberculosis at an early age.

Works 
 Deedah e Bedaar
 Kullaiyat e Qabil
 Mutala i Qabil Ajmeri

References

1931 births
1962 deaths
Pakistani poets
Urdu-language poets from Pakistan
People from Hyderabad District, Pakistan
Urdu critics
Pakistani people of Rajasthani descent
People from Ajmer